MakeMsi is a tool for creating .msi software installation packages for Windows. To create an installation package, the user needs to create short text file and process it through MakeMsi. The licensing allows it to be used for both open source and commercial projects. MakeMsi is written by Dennis Bareis.

Microsoft awarded Dennis Bareis an MVP (Most Valuable Professional) for his work on Windows Installers.

References

Windows administration